The 1911 Wellington City mayoral election was part of the New Zealand local elections held that same year. In 1911, elections were held for the Mayor of Wellington plus other local government positions including fifteen city councillors, also elected biannually. Thomas Wilford, the incumbent Mayor sought re-election and retained office unopposed with no other candidates emerging. The polling was conducted using the standard first-past-the-post electoral method.

Councillor results

References

Mayoral elections in Wellington
1911 elections in New Zealand
Politics of the Wellington Region
1910s in Wellington